Singularia is a genus of moths in the family Pterophoridae. It includes all species formerly placed in the genus Chocophorus and five new species described in 2016.

Species 
Singularia alternaria (Zeller, 1874)
Singularia brechlini Kovtunovich & Ustjuzhanin, 2016
Singularia carabayus (Arenberger, 1990)
Singularia guajiro Kovtunovich & Ustjuzhanin, 2016
Singularia leptochorda (Meyrick, 1913)
Singularia lesya Kovtunovich & Ustjuzhanin, 2016
Singularia mayaensis (Gielis, 2011)
Singularia sinjaevi Kovtunovich & Ustjuzhanin, 2016
Singularia solisi (Gielis & Matthews-Lott, 1994)
Singularia tolima Kovtunovich & Ustjuzhanin, 2016
Singularia venedictoffi (Gielis & Matthews-Lott, 1994)
Singularia walsinghami (Fernald, 1898)

References

Pterophorini
Moth genera